P.V.Radhakrishna Pillai or Plavalil Kizhakkethil Vasudevan Radhakrishna Pillai is an Indian engineer based in Bahrain.  He was born in Mavelikara, in Alappuzha district Kerala of India.

He has been awarded the Pravasi Bharatiya Samman by President of India Pratibha Patil in January 2012 for his contributions among non residence Indian. He held the positions of President, Bahrain Keraleeya Samajam, Chairman Indian School, Bahrain 2002–2008, President Surya Bahrain chapter.

He is working as a senior engineer in the ministry of electricity and water of the Kingdom of Bahrain but had earlier served in the Kerala State Electricity Board.

He is the president of Bahrain Keraleeya Samajam, which one of the biggest expatriate communities in the Kingdom of Bahrain.

Award

Achievements
2014 The Outstanding Alumnus by Shashi Tharoor

References

Sources

https://web.archive.org/web/20131203002228/http://bigfaces.com/profile/detail/p-v-radhakrishna-pillai173
http://www.gulf-daily-news.com/NewsDetails.aspx?storyid=147652
http://timesofindia.indiatimes.com/topic/Bahrain-Keraleeya-Samajam

Indian emigrants to Bahrain
Living people
Burmese Hindus
Year of birth missing (living people)
Recipients of Pravasi Bharatiya Samman
1990 in India
Evacuations of Indians
Airlifts